The Adder-class monitors were a group of six ironclad monitors built for the Royal Netherlands Navy in the 1870s.

Context 
The Adder class monitors very much resembled the preceding Heiligerlee class. There were some small differences, but the main difference was that the Adder class got a ram, which was very popular after the Battle of Lissa.

Haai would become the first monitor to be built by a private Dutch shipyard.

Armament 
Just like the preceding Heiligerlee class, the Adders were armed with two 23 cm Armstrong rifled muzzle loaders. Luipaard differed by having only a single Krupp 28 cm breechloader, known as 28 cm A No. 1.

Later all ships of the class were re-armed with the 28 cm A No. 1, except Adder, which sank beforehand.

Ships

See also 
 List of ironclads

References

Notes

Ironclad classes
Monitors of the Royal Netherlands Navy
Royal Netherlands Navy
19th-century naval ships of the Netherlands